is an unarmed modern Japanese martial art, Olympic sport (since 1964), and the most prominent form of jacket wrestling competed internationally. Judo was created in 1882 by Kanō Jigorō as an eclectic martial art, distinguishing itself from its predecessors (primarily Tenjin Shinyo-ryu jujutsu and Kitō-ryū jujutsu) due to an emphasis on "randori" (lit. 'free sparring') instead of "kata" (pre-arranged forms) alongside its removal of striking and weapon training elements. Judo rose to prominence for its dominance over established jujutsu schools in tournaments hosted by the Tokyo Metropolitan Police Department (警視庁武術大会, Keishicho Bujutsu Taikai), resulting in its adoption as the department's primary martial art.

The objective of competitive judo is to throw an opponent, immobilize them with a pin, or force an opponent to submit with a joint lock or a choke. While strikes and use of weapons are included in some pre-arranged forms (kata), they are not frequently trained and are illegal in judo competition or free practice. Judo's international governing body is the International Judo Federation, and competitors compete in the international IJF professional circuit.

Judo's philosophy revolves around two primary principles: "Seiryoku-Zenyo" (lit. 'maximum efficient use of energy') and "Jita-Kyoei" (lit. 'mutual welfare and benefit'). Judo also spawned a number of derivative martial arts around the world, such as Brazilian jiu-jitsu, Krav Maga, sambo, and ARB. Judo also influenced other combat styles such as close-quarters combat (CQC), mixed martial arts (MMA), shoot wrestling and submission wrestling.

History and philosophy

Early life of its founder

The early history of judo is inseparable from its founder, Japanese polymath and educator , born . Kano was born into a relatively affluent family. His father, Jirosaku, was the second son of the head priest of the Shinto Hiyoshi shrine in Shiga Prefecture. He married Sadako Kano, daughter of the owner of Kiku-Masamune sake brewing company and was adopted by the family, changing his name to Kano. He ultimately became an official in the Shogunate government.

Jigoro Kano had an academic upbringing and, from the age of seven, he studied English,  and the  under a number of tutors. When he was fourteen, Kano began boarding at an English-medium school, Ikuei-Gijuku in Shiba, Tokyo.

Early attempts to find a jujutsu teacher who was willing to take him on met with little success. Jujutsu had become unfashionable in an increasingly westernized Japan. Many of those who had once taught the art had been forced out of teaching or become so disillusioned with it that they had simply given up. Nakai Umenari, an acquaintance of Kanō's father and a former soldier, agreed to show him kata, but not to teach him. The caretaker of Jirosaku's second house, Katagiri Ryuji, also knew jujutsu, but would not teach it as he believed it was no longer of practical use. Another frequent visitor, Imai Genshiro of  school of jujutsu, also refused. Several years passed before he finally found a willing teacher.

In 1877, as a student at the Tokyo-Kaisei school (soon to become part of the newly founded Tokyo Imperial University), Kano learned that many jujutsu teachers had been forced to pursue alternative careers, frequently opening .

Kano chose to continue his studies at another Tenjin Shin'yō-ryū school, that of Iso Masatomo (–1881). Iso placed more emphasis on the practice of "kata", and entrusted randori instruction to assistants, increasingly to Kano.

Founding of the Kodokan

Iikubo, Kano's Kitō-ryū instructor, attended the dōjō three days a week to help teach and, although two years would pass before the temple would be called by the name , and Kano had not yet received his  in Kitō-ryū, this is now regarded as the Kodokan founding.

The Eisho-ji dōjō was originally shoin. It was a relatively small affair, consisting of a 12 jo (214 sq ft) training area. Kano took in resident and non-resident students, the first two being Tomita Tsunejirō and Shiro Saigo. In August, the following year, the pair were granted  grades, the first that had been awarded in any martial art.

Judo versus Jujutsu

He illustrated the application of seiryoku zen'yō with the concept of :

Kano realised that seiryoku zen'yō, initially conceived as a jujutsu concept, had a wider philosophical application. Kano rejected techniques that did not conform to these principles and emphasised the importance of efficiency in the execution of techniques. He was convinced that practice of jujutsu while conforming to these ideals was a route to self-improvement and the betterment of society in general. He was, however, acutely conscious of the Japanese public's negative perception of jujutsu:

Kano believed that "jūjutsu was insufficient to describe his art: although  means "art" or "means", it implies a method consisting of a collection of physical techniques. Thus Kano renamed it .

Judo waza (techniques)

Judo is mostly known for nage-waza and katame-waza.

Several distinct types of ukemi exist, including ; ; ; and 

Nage-waza (throwing techniques)
Nage-waza include all techniques in which tori attempts to throw or trip uke, usually with the aim of placing uke on his back. Each technique has three distinct stages:

: the opponent becoming off balanced;
: turning in and fitting into the throw;
: execution and completion of the throw.

Katame-waza (grappling techniques)

In competitive judo, Kansetsu-waza is currently limited to elbow joint manipulation. Manipulation and locking of other joints can be found in various kata, such as Katame-no-kata and Kodokan goshin jutsu.

Atemi-waza (striking techniques)
Atemi-waza are techniques in which tori disables uke with a strike to a vital point. Atemi-waza are not permitted outside of kata.

Pedagogy

Randori (free practice)
Judo pedagogy emphasizes . This term covers a variety of forms of practice, and the intensity at which it is carried out varies depending on intent and the level of expertise of the participants. At the opposite extreme from yakusoku geiko is the hard style of randori that seeks to emulate the style of judo seen in competition. While hard randori is the cornerstone of judo, over-emphasis of the competitive aspect is seen as undesirable by traditionalists if the intent of the randori is to "win" rather than to learn.

Kata (forms)

 are pre-arranged patterns of techniques and in judo, with the exception of elements of the Seiryoku-Zen'yō Kokumin-Taiiku, they are all practised with a partner. Their purposes include illustrating the basic principles of judo, demonstrating the correct execution of a technique, teaching the philosophical tenets upon which judo is based, allowing for the practice of techniques that are not allowed in randori, and to preserve ancient techniques that are historically important but are no longer used in contemporary judo.

There are ten kata that are recognized by the Kodokan today:

 , comprising two kata:
  Fifteen throws, practiced both left- and right-handed, three each from the five categories of nage waza: te waza, koshi waza, ashi waza, ma sutemi waza and yoko sutemi waza.
 . Fifteen techniques in three sets of five, illustrating the three categories of katame waza: osaekomi waza, shime waza and kansetsu waza.
 . Twenty techniques, illustrating the principles of defence in a combat situation, performed from kneeling and standing positions. Attacks are made unarmed and armed with a dagger and a sword. This kata utilises atemi waza, striking techniques, that are forbidden in randori.
 . The most recent recognised kata, comprising twenty-one techniques of defence against attack from an unarmed assailant and one armed with a knife, stick and pistol. This kata incorporates various jujutsu techniques such as wrist locks and atemi waza.
 . Fifteen techniques, arranged in three sets of five, demonstrating the principle of Jū and its correct use in offence and defence.
 . One of the oldest kata, comprising ten forms that illustrate the efficient use of force and resistance. Now rarely practiced.
 . An advanced kata, illustrating the principle of seiryoku zen'yō and the movements of the universe. The kata predates the creation of Kodokan and originated in Tenjin Shinyō-ryū.
 . Derived from Kitō-ryū Jujutsu, this kata was originally intended to be performed wearing armour. Kano chose to preserve it as it embodied the principles of judo.
 . A series of exercises designed to develop the physique for judo.
 . An exercise completed in 1943, and of which the development was ordered by Jiro Nango, the second Kodokan president.

In addition, there are a number of commonly practiced kata that are not recognised by the Kodokan. Some of the more common kata include:

  A "kata" of pre-emptive counter techniques that some claim has a heritage from Waseda University in Tokyo. The form is little more than standard counters, bookended by some protocol.  Moreover, there is no universal standard nor accepted reference text.  The exercise is unknown of in Japan, and was  popularised in the West by Mikinosuke Kawaishi.
  A much more elegant and coherent kata of counter techniques, created by Kyuzo Mifune.
  a kata of counter-attacks to controlling techniques, attributed to

Tandoku-renshu (practice by oneself)
 Personal work.

Competitive judo

History

 is a vitally important aspect of judo. In 1899, Kano was asked to chair a committee of the Dai Nippon Butoku Kai to draw up the first formal set of contest rules for jujutsu. These rules were intended to cover contests between different various traditional schools of jujutsu as well as practitioners of Kodokan judo. Contests were 15 minutes long and were judged on the basis of nage waza and katame waza, excluding atemi waza. Wins were by two ippons, awarded in every four-main different path of winning alternatives, by "Throwing", where the opponent's back strikes flat onto the mat with sufficient force, by "Pinning" them on their back for a "sufficient" amount of time, or by "Submission", which could be achieved via Shime-waza or Kansetsu-waza, in which the opponent was forced to give himself or herself up or summon a referee's or corner-judge's stoppage. Finger, toe and ankle locks were prohibited. In 1900, these rules were adopted by the Kodokan with amendments made to prohibit all joint locks for kyu grades and added wrist locks to the prohibited kansetsu-waza for dan grades. It was also stated that the ratio of tachi-waza to ne-waza should be between 70% to 80% for kyu grades and 60% to 70% for dan grades.

In 1916, additional rulings were brought in to further limit kansetsu waza with the prohibition of ashi garami and neck locks, as well as do jime. These were further added to in 1925.

Jigoro Kano for a long time wished to see judo as an Olympic discipline. The first time judo was seen in the Olympic Games was in an informal demonstration hosted by Kano at the 1932 Games. However, Kano was ambivalent about judo's potential inclusion as an Olympic sport:

Use of Judo at the Summer Olympic Games

At the 57th general session of the International Olympic Committee, held in Rome on 22 August 1960, the IOC members formally decided to include Judo among the events to be contested at the Olympic Games. The proposal, which was placed before the session by the Japanese delegation, was welcomed by all participants. The few who opposed had nothing against Judo itself but against increasing the number of Olympic events as a whole. There were only two dissenting votes in the final poll. For the first time in history a traditional Japanese sport has been included in the Olympic competition.

Finally, judo was first contested as an Olympic sport for men in the 1964 Games in Tokyo. The Olympic Committee initially dropped judo for the 1968 Olympics, meeting protests. Dutchman Anton Geesink won the first Olympic gold medal in the open division of judo by defeating Akio Kaminaga of Japan. The women's event was introduced at the Olympics in 1988 as a demonstration event, and an official medal event in 1992.

Use of Judo at the Summer Paralympic Games

Judo was introduced as a Paralympic sport at the 1988 Summer Paralympics in Seoul, with women's events contested for the first time at 2004 Summer Paralympics.

Use of Judo at the Commonwealth Games

Judo was an optional sport included in the 3 editions of the Commonwealth Games: 1990 Commonwealth Games in Auckland, 2002 Commonwealth Games in Manchester and 2014 Commonwealth Games in  Glasgow. From 2022, Judo will become a core sport in the 22nd edition of the Commonwealth Games, in Birmingham.

Current international contest rules

Penalties may be given for: passivity or preventing progress in the match; for safety infringements for example by using prohibited techniques, or for behavior that is deemed to be against the spirit of judo. Fighting must be stopped if a participant is outside the designated area on the mat.

Weight divisions
There are currently seven weight divisions, subject to change by governing bodies, and may be modified based on the age of the competitors:

Competition scoring
Two scores of waza-ari equal an ippon . This rule was cancelled in 2017, but it was resumed in 2018.

In 2017, the International Judo Federation announced changes in evaluation of points. There will only be ippon and waza-ari scores given during a match with yuko scores now included within waza-ari.

Ippon is scored in ne-waza for pinning an opponent on his back with a recognised osaekomi-waza for 20 seconds or by forcing a submission through shime-waza or kansetsu-waza. A submission is signalled by tapping the mat or the opponent at least twice with the hand or foot, or by saying . A pin lasting for less than 20 seconds, but more than 10 seconds scores waza-ari (formerly waza-ari was awarded for holds of longer than 15 seconds and yuko for holds of longer than 10 seconds).

This has since been removed.

If the scores are identical at the end of the match, the contest is resolved by the Golden Score rule. Golden Score is a sudden death situation where the clock is reset to match-time, and the first contestant to achieve any score wins.

There have been changes to the scoring. In January 2013, the Hantei was removed and the "Golden Score" no longer has a time limit. The match would continue until a judoka scored through a technique or if the opponent is penalised (Hansoku-make).

Penalties
Two types of penalties may be awarded. A shido (指導 literally "guidance") is awarded for minor rule infringements. A shido can also be awarded for a prolonged period of non-aggression. Recent rule changes allow for the first shidos to result in only warnings. If there is a tie, then and only then, will the number of shidos (if less than three) be used to determine the winner. After three shidos are given, the victory is given to the opponent, constituting an indirect hansoku-make (反則負け literally "foul-play defeat"), but does not result in expulsion from the tournament. Note: Prior to 2017, the 4th shido was hansoku-make. If hansoku-make is awarded for a major rule infringement, it results not just in loss of the match, but in the expulsion from the tournament of the penalized player.

In mixed martial arts

A number of judo practitioners have made an impact in mixed martial arts. Notable judo-trained MMA fighters include Olympic medalists Hidehiko Yoshida (Gold, 1992), Naoya Ogawa (Silver, 1992), Paweł Nastula (Gold, 1996), Makoto Takimoto (Gold, 2000), Satoshi Ishii (Gold, 2008), Ronda Rousey (Bronze, 2008), and Kayla Harrison (Gold, 2012 and 2016), former Russian national judo championship bronze medalist Fedor Emelianenko, Yoshihiro Akiyama, Don Frye, Rick Hawn, Daniel Kelly, Hector Lombard, Karo Parisyan, Ayaka Hamasaki, Antônio Silva, Oleg Taktarov, Rhadi Ferguson, and Dong-Sik Yoon.

Alternative rulesets and derivative martial arts

Kano Jigoro's Kodokan judo is the most popular and well-known style of judo, but is not the only one. The terms judo and jujutsu were quite interchangeable in the early years, so some of these forms of judo are still known as jujutsu or jiu-jitsu either for that reason, or simply to differentiate them from mainstream judo. From Kano's original style of judo, several related forms have evolved—some now widely considered to be distinct arts:

: Sometimes erroneously described as a separate style of Judo, Kosen judo is a competition rules set of Kodokan judo that was popularized in the early 20th century for use in Japanese Special High Schools Championships held at Kyoto Imperial University. Kosen judo's focus on newaza has drawn comparisons with Brazilian jiu-jitsu.
Russian judo: This distinctive style of judo was influenced by the Russian martial art called Sambo. It is represented by well-known coaches such as Alexander Retuinskih and Igor Yakimov, and mixed martial arts fighters such as Fedor Emelianenko, Karo Parisyan and Khabib Nurmagomedov. In turn, Russian judo has influenced mainstream judo, with techniques such as the flying armbar being accepted into Kodokan judo.
Sambo (especially Sport Sambo): a derivative of Judo combined with wrestling techniques, and striking in case of Combat Sambo. Vasili Oshchepkov was the first European judo black belt under Kano. Oshchepkov went on to contribute his knowledge of judo as one of the three founders of Sambo, which also integrated various international and Soviet bloc wrestling styles and other combative techniques. Oshchepkov died during the political purges of 1937. In their History of Sambo, Brett Jacques and Scott Anderson wrote that in Russia "judo and SOMBO were considered to be the same thing"—albeit with a different uniform and some differences in the rules.
Brazilian jiu jitsu developed by the Gracie family, who learnt traditional Kodokan judo from Japanese judoka, Mitsuyo Maeda in 1917.
Freestyle Judo is a form of competitive judo practiced primarily in the United States that retains techniques that have been removed from mainstream IJF rules. Freestyle Judo is currently backed by the International Freestyle Judo Alliance (IFJA). The Amateur Athletic Union (AAU) officially sanctions Freestyle Judo in the United States of America.
Filipino "Pangamot" is a form of competitive judo and mixed martial arts practice where practitioners invite opponents to use an eskrima stick in throwing, grappling, and sparring practice. The most well-known Pangamot training hall is the World Doce Pares Headquarters in Cebu City, Philippines. The head Pangamot instructor between 1955 and 2017 was Judo 8th Dan and Eskrima World Champion, Ciriaco Cañete. American Pangamot instructors include former Army Ranger, Christopher J. Petrilli, mixed martial arts coach Thomas Weissmuller, and UFC Coach, Ray Yee.

Judo also influenced other combat styles such as close-quarters combat (CQC), mixed martial arts (MMA), shoot wrestling and submission wrestling.

Safety
Kano's vision for judo was one of a martial way that could be practiced realistically. Randori (free practice) was a central part of judo pedagogy and shiai (competition) a crucial test of a judoka's understanding of judo. Safety necessitated some basic innovations that shaped judo's development. Atemi waza (striking techniques) were entirely limited to kata (prearranged forms) early in judo's history. Kansetsu waza (joint manipulation techniques) were limited to techniques that focused on the elbow joint. Various throwing techniques that were judged to be too dangerous to practice safely at full force, such as all joint-locking throws from Jujutsu, were also prohibited in shiai. To maximise safety in nage waza (throwing techniques), judoka trained in ukemi (break falls) and practiced on tatami (rice straw mats).

Kansetsu and shime waza
The application of joint manipulation and strangulation/choking techniques is generally safe under controlled conditions typical of judo dōjō and in competition. It is usual for there to be age restrictions on the practice and application of these types of techniques, but the exact nature of these restrictions will vary from country to country and from organization to organization.

Nage waza
Safety in the practice of throwing techniques depends on the skill level of both tori and uke. Inexpertly applied throws have the potential to injure both tori and uke, for instance when tori compensates for poor technique by powering through the throw. Similarly, poor ukemi can result in injury, particularly from more powerful throws that uke lacks the skill to breakfall from. For these reasons, throws are normally taught in order of difficulty for both tori and uke. This is exemplified in the Gokyo , a traditional grouping of throws arranged in order of difficulty of ukemi.

Judoka (practitioner)
The modern meaning of "judoka" in English is a judo practitioner of any level of expertise, but traditionally those below the rank of 4th dan were called ; and only those of 4th dan or higher were called "judoka". (The suffix , when added to a noun, means a person with expertise or special knowledge on that subject).

A judo teacher is called . The word sensei comes from sen or saki (before) and sei (life) – i.e. one who has preceded you. In Western dōjō, it is common to call an instructor of any dan grade sensei. Traditionally, that title was reserved for instructors of 4th dan and above.

Judogi (uniform)

Judo practitioners traditionally wear white uniforms called  or  sometimes abbreviated in the west as "gi". Early examples of keikogi had short sleeves and trouser legs and the modern long-sleeved judogi was adopted in 1906.

The modern use of the blue judogi for high level competition was first suggested by Anton Geesink at the 1986 Maastricht IJF DC Meeting. For competition, a blue judogi is worn by one of the two competitors for ease of distinction by judges, referees, and spectators. In Japan, both judoka use a white judogi and the traditional red obi (based on the colors of the Japanese flag) is affixed to the belt of one competitor. Outside Japan, a colored obi may also be used for convenience in minor competitions, the blue judogi only being mandatory at the regional or higher levels, depending on organization. Japanese practitioners and traditionalists tend to look down on the use of blue because judo is considered a pure sport, and replacing the pure white judogi with the impure blue is an offense.

For events organized under the auspices of the International judo Federation (IJF), judogi have to bear the IJF Official Logo Mark Label. This label demonstrates that the judogi has passed a number of quality control tests to ensure it conforms to construction regulations ensuring it is not too stiff, flexible, rigid or slippery to allow the opponent to grip or to perform techniques.

Organizations
The international governing body for judo is the International Judo Federation (IJF), founded in 1951. Members of the IJF include the African Judo Union (AJU), the Pan-American Judo Confederation (PJC), the Judo Union of Asia (JUA), the European Judo Union (EJU) and the Oceania Judo Union (OJU), each comprising a number of national judo associations. The IJF is responsible for organising international competition and hosts the World Judo Championships and is involved in running the Olympic Judo events.

Rank and grading

Judo is a hierarchical art, where seniority of judoka is designated by what is known as the  - ranking system. This system was developed by Jigoro Kano and was based on the ranking system in the board game Go.

Beginning students progress through kyu grades towards dan grades.

A judoka's position within the kyu-dan ranking system is displayed by the color of their belt. The kyu-dan ranking system has since been widely adopted by modern martial arts.

The highest black belt ranks  have no formal requirements and are decided by the president of the Kodokan. Kano Jigoro's grandson Kano Yukimitsu served as the fourth president from 1980 until 2009. As an educator by profession, Kanō believed that there should be no end to an individual's learning, and therefore no limit to the number of dan ranks. As of 2011, fifteen Japanese men have been promoted to the tenth degree black belt judan by the Kodokan; the IJF and Western and Asian national federations have promoted another eleven who are not recognized at that level of rank by the Kodokan. On 28 July 2011, the promotion board of USA Judo awarded Keiko Fukuda the rank of 10th dan, who was the first woman to be promoted to judo's highest level, albeit not a Kodokan-recognized rank.

Although dan ranks tend to be consistent between national organizations there is more variation in the kyū grades, with some countries having more kyū grades. Although initially kyū'' grade belt colours were uniformly white, today a variety of colours are used. The first black belts to denote a dan rank in the 1880s, initially the wide obi was used; as practitioners trained in kimono, only white and black obi were used. It was not until the early 1900s, after the introduction of the judogi, that an expanded colored belt system of awarding rank was created. Written accounts from the archives of London's Budokwai judo club, founded in 1918, record the use of coloured judo belts at the 1926 9th annual Budokwai Display, and a list of ranked colored judokas appears in the Budokwai Committee Minutes of June 1927. Kawaishi visited London and the Budokwai in 1928, and was probably inspired to bring the coloured belt system to France.

World Judo Day 
On October 28th of every year, the judo community celebrates the World Judo Day in the honor of the birth of Judo's founder, Jigoro Kano. The theme of the World Judo Day changes from year to year, but the goal is always to highlight the moral values of Judo. The first celebration was held in 2011. Past themes for the celebration have included: 

 Inclusion (2022)
 Solidarity (2021)
 Stronger Together (2020)
 Plant a Tree (2019)
 Friendship (2018)
 Courage (2017)

Filmography
Akira Kurosawa, 1943.
Akira Kurosawa, 1945.
Johnnie To, 2004.

See also

Judo by country
List of celebrity judoka
List of judo techniques, partial list of judo techniques
List of judoka
List of World Champions in Judo
Jacket wrestling

Footnotes

Bibliography

External links
International Judo Federation (IJF)—The worldwide governing body for judo
All judoka profiles at Judoinside.com
Kodokan Judo Institute—Headquarters of judo (Kano Jigoro's school)

 
Dō
Combat sports
Gendai budo
Summer Olympic sports
Japanese martial arts
Sport in Japan
Grappling
Mixed martial arts styles
Sports originating in Japan